Pure Speculation Festival, also known as Pure Spec, is an annual multi-genre fan convention taking place in Edmonton, Canada. It is an event that prides itself on being "by geeks, for geeks." Founded as a speculative fiction convention, it repackaged itself as a festival celebrating geek and fan culture in 2008. It offers programming dealing with science fiction, fantasy, pop culture, gaming, anime, comic books and webcomics.

In addition to the usual fare such as panels, games and a vendor room, there are several special events the festival hosts every year. The annual Costume Shindig happens on the Saturday of the event, featuring prizes in a variety of silly categories for guests and attendees. The Geeks for Geeks Charity Auction is also a yearly feature, in support of local charities.

Several smaller components also help to create the larger Pure Speculation Festival. These include Con*Spec, a writing and literature segment run by On Spec Magazine, and Comic Talks, a series of comic book panels hosted by Happy Harbor Comics. Until 2007, Pure Spec also played host to Con of Cold, an RPGA sanctioned Dungeons & Dragons event. Edmonton based BioWare also involves itself in the festival yearly, hosting panels and offering prize support.

History
In 2004, a group of friends calling themselves The Four Stooges came together with a common goal. At the time, Edmonton didn't have a major fan convention with the notable exception of Animethon, whose focus is entirely upon anime. They decided to put together a speculative fiction convention to give fans of science fiction and fantasy pop-culture somewhere to gather every year.

The first Pure Speculation Convention took place in October 2005 at the Coast Terrace Inn, and had a decent turnout for a first-time gathering.

After the first event, the realities of organisation made the Four Stooges reach out to find other organisers to help further expand and develop the event. The Pure Speculation Society was founded to better plan and execute the 2006 convention. The festival was also moved to the Delta Edmonton South that year.

The convention was moved to the Hazeldean Community Hall in 2007. The smaller attendance, normal for a young convention, coupled with the high cost for the rental of the Delta made the society reevaluate it as a venue. The show remained at Hazeldean Hall for several years.

In 2008 the event went through its next major evolution, repackaging itself as the Pure Speculation Festival. The focus would now expand to become a celebration of fan culture, and all it encompasses.

In 2009 the decision was made to move the festival to the Shaw Conference Centre in downtown Edmonton, due to swelling attendance and issues with renovation at Hazeldean Hall. In addition to the move, a Friday evening cabaret called Pre Spec was also added to the program of events for the first time. It features an evening of entertainment with many of guests and staff.

Continuing venue issues brought Pure Spec full circle in 2010, when it returned to its first venue, now the Radisson Edmonton South Hotel. Growing attendance encouraged a move Grant MacEwan University in 2011. This would also be the year that Pure Spec attempted to Skype in a guest for a panel.

Organization
Since 2008, Pure Spec has been run by the Pure Speculation Society, a not-for profit society dedicated to planning, organising and running the festival. All proceeds of the event go back into funding it.

[[Brent Jans]] acted as Festival Director of Pure Spec for 6 years, starting with the very first event in 2005. Jans decided to step down from the position in 2010.

In 2011 three members of the Pure Speculation Society stepped up to act as co-directors for the festival, to ensure its continuation.

Local Support
Pure Spec has a strong focus toward helping promote local and independent authors, artists and publications in Edmonton, Alberta and Canada. This is an aspect of the festival that the Pure Speculation Society is strongly behind, and will remain a focus of the event into the future.

To that end, many of the festival's guests are drawn from the local independent publishing community, giving them an opportunity to mingle with industry professionals and get their name out.

In addition, proceeds from the Geeks for Geeks Charity Auction go back into the community, helping support a variety of local charities.

Other Events
In addition to the main Pure Speculation Festival, the organising society also hosts Shepherd's Double Feature Picture Shows and Cheapass Fundraisers throughout the year to help raise money for the event.

2011 saw the addition of Mini Spec, a smaller event held in May with one speaker from each of the main panel streams featured in the larger festival.

Past Festivals

See also
Fandom
Gaming convention
Science fiction convention

References

External links

Science fiction conventions in Canada
Multigenre conventions
Festivals in Edmonton
Recurring events established in 2005